Hadena silenides is a species of moth of the  family Noctuidae. It is found in Portugal, Spain, from Mauritania to Egypt, Israel, Lebanon, Syria, Jordan, the Arabian Peninsula, Iraq and Iran.

Adults are on wing from January to April in one generation in Israel.

External links
 Hadeninae of Israel

Hadena
Moths of Europe
Moths of Africa
Moths of Asia
Moths described in 1895